People's Home Journal was a general interest magazine, which ran from 1885–1929. It was directed toward women, housewives and families. A typical issue would feature recipes, household tips, entertaining and informative tidbits, along with short stories of lighthearted adventure, mystery and suspense. The earliest issues also contained articles on agricultural subjects.  PHJ also sold their own line of sewing patterns and embroidery transfers.  These were featured in a catalog called The Home Dressmaker and Needlework Instructor (debut 1924).

History 
It was published out of New York by F. M. (Frank Moore) Lupton. The presidency was turned over to Moody B. (Bliss) Gates in 1912. Their monthly circulation hovered around one million for many years. That ranked among the highest in the industry. A big-name short story contributor to the magazine was author Ellis Parker Butler.

References

External links       
 PHJ covers. MagazineArt.org. This link shows over sixty of their covers, between the years 1898 and 1929.
PHJ Patterns A selection of People's Home Journal sewing patterns.

Defunct women's magazines published in the United States
Magazines established in 1885
Magazines disestablished in 1929
Defunct magazines published in the United States